Pantera is an American heavy metal band.

Pantera or Panteras may also refer to:

Military
 Russian submarine Pantera (K-317), a nuclear-powered attack submarine
 Italian destroyer Pantera, a Royal Italian Navy destroyer launched in 1924
 ENAER Pantera, a Chilean variant of the Dassault Mirage 5 fighter aircraft
 Helibras HM-1 Pantera, a Brazilian Army variant of the Eurocopter AS565 Panther
 Lockheed Martin Pantera, a targeting pod for tactical bombers
 Wz. 93 Pantera, standard camouflage of the Polish Armed Forces

Organisations
 Pantera foundation, a reception center for big cats in the Netherlands
 Pantera Press, an Australian book publisher
 Panteras, a faction of the Gulf Cartel drug-trafficking organization

People
 Tiberius Julius Abdes Pantera (c. 22 BC–40 AD), Roman soldier claimed by some to be the father of Jesus
 Orlando Pantera (1967–2001), Cape Verdean singer and composer Orlando Monteiro Barreto
 Pantera (wrestler) (born 1964), ring name of Mexican professional wrestler Francisco Javier Pozas
 Esmeralda Falcón (born 1995), Mexican boxer nicknamed "La Pantera"

Sport
 Panteras de Aguascalientes, a Mexican professional basketball team based in Aguascalientes City
 Panteras de Miranda, a Venezuelan professional basketball club based in Miranda
 Panteras del Distrito Nacional, original name (2005–2009) of Leones de Santo Domingo, a professional basketball team based in Santo Domingo, Dominican Republic

Vehicles
 De Tomaso Pantera, an automobile
 Pantera, nickname for any patrol car used by law enforcement in Italy
 SS Pantera, an Italian cargo ship

Other uses
 Pantera, a district or ward of the Italian city of Siena
 Pantera, an album by Rahul Dev Burman and Jose Flores
 El Pantera, a Mexican television series
 Pantera, a brand of Zeos computer
 Pantera, a dialectal variant of the Nafanan language of Ghana
 "Pantera", a 2019 song by Anitta, from Charlie's Angels: Original Motion Picture Soundtrack

See also
 Panera
 Panthera (disambiguation)
 Panther (disambiguation)